Henry Thomas Cole  (1816 – 5 January 1885) was a Liberal Party politician.

Laycock was elected Liberal MP for Penryn and Falmouth in 1874, but stood down at the next election in 1880.

Cole became a barrister in 1842, entering Middle Temple, and later became a Queen's Counsel in 1867. He was also Recorder of Penzance from 1862 to 1872, and Recorder of Plymouth and Devonport.

References

External links
 

Liberal Party (UK) MPs for English constituencies
UK MPs 1874–1880
People from Bath, Somerset
1816 births
1885 deaths
Members of the Parliament of the United Kingdom for Penryn and Falmouth
Members of the Middle Temple
19th-century King's Counsel